is a railway station in the town of Ibigawa, Ibi District, Gifu Prefecture, Japan, operated by the private railway operator Yōrō Railway.

Lines

Station layout
Ibi Station has a single ground-level side platform. The station is staffed.

Adjacent stations

|-
!colspan=5|Yōrō Railway

History
Ibi Station opened on April 27, 1919.

Passenger statistics
In fiscal 2015, the station was used by an average of 1,478 passengers daily (boarding passengers only).

Surrounding area
 Japan National Route 417

See also
 List of Railway Stations in Japan

References

External links

 

Railway stations in Gifu Prefecture
Railway stations in Japan opened in 1919
Stations of Yōrō Railway
Ibigawa, Gifu